Aeromonas lacus is a bacterium from the genus Aeromonas which has been isolated from a humic lake in Huutjärvi in Finland.

References

 

Aeromonadales
Bacteria described in 2015